WAPW may refer to:

 WAPW-CD, a television station (channel 23, virtual channel 19) licensed to Abingdon, etc., Virginia, United States
 WWWQ, a radio station (99.7 FM) licensed to Atlanta, Georgia, United States, which used the call sign WAPW from February 1988 to November 1992

Other uses

 WAPW Faculty of Architecture, Warsaw University of Technology